Pedro Segura y Sáenz (4 December 1880 – 8 April 1957) was a Spanish Cardinal of the Roman Catholic Church who served as Archbishop of Toledo from 1927 to 1931, and Archbishop of Seville from 1937 until 1954. Segura was elevated to the cardinalate in 1927.

Biography

Born in Carazo in 1880, Pedro Segura y Sáenz attended the seminary in Burgos and the Pontifical University of Comillas before being ordained to the priesthood on 9 June 1906. He then did pastoral work in Burgos, at whose seminary he also taught. In 1912, Segura was made a professor at the Pontifical University of Valladolid, of which he was also Prefect of Studies, and a cathedral canon. He also served in the archdiocesan curia, including holding the post of Director of Works.

On 14 March 1916 Segura was appointed Auxiliary Bishop of Valladolid and Titular Bishop of Apollonia. He received his episcopal consecration on the following 13 June from Cardinal José Cos y Macho, with Bishops Vicente Sánchez de Castro and Julián de Diego y García Alcolea serving as co-consecrators. He became Bishop of Coria on 10 July 1920. After being promoted to Archbishop of Burgos on 20 December 1926, Segura was named Archbishop of Toledo by Pope Pius XI on 19 December 1927. In virtue of his position as Archbishop of Toledo, he was also Primate of Spain.

Segura was created Cardinal-Priest of Santa Maria in Trastevere by Pope Pius in the consistory of 19 December the same year. As he could not attend the actual ceremony, he later received his red hat personally from Pius on 28 October 1929. In July 1931, the Primate was sent into exile in France by the Republican government he had publicly denounced while extolling the monarchy. He resigned as Toledo's archbishop on the following 26 September and was made Archbishop of Seville on 14 September 1937 on the death of Navarrese Cardinal Eustaquio Ilundain y Esteban. The Cardinal was one of the electors who participated in the 1939 papal conclave, which selected Pope Pius XII.

A staunch conservative, Segura upheld the Church's teaching in the December 1864 Syllabus of Errors by Pope Pius IX, condemning separation of Church and state, especially opposing toleration of Protestants, and condemned the belief "that all religions are equally acceptable in the presence of God". He also described the Inquisition as "meritorious", and prohibited Sevillian Catholics from attending movies and dances. He likewise opposed giving the vote to the 5,000,000 women in Spain over the age of 21.

Late in his administration, a series of pamphlets were distributed which were seen as attacking Segura's enemies, who were considered to include the Pope and the Spanish nuncio. Segura was considered to have been the source of the pamphlets. The Holy See applauded the Chapter of Seville Cathedral's condemnation of these leaflets. The appointment of José Bueno y Monreal as coadjutor archbishop by the Vatican was seen as response to the publication of the pamphlets. In November 1954 Segura was recalled from his position by the Vatican but refused to leave the Archbishoprical Mansion and had to be removed by police.

Segura died from a kidney ailment in Madrid, at age 76. He is buried in Cerro del Sagrado Corazón.

References

External links
Cardinals of the Holy Roman Church

1880 births
1957 deaths
People from the Province of Burgos
Archbishops of Toledo
20th-century Spanish cardinals
20th-century Roman Catholic archbishops in Spain
Roman Catholic archbishops of Seville
Spanish monarchists
Archbishops of Burgos
Comillas Pontifical University alumni